Coryphellina marcusorum, (Spanish common name: Eolidáceo de Marcus) is a species of sea slug, an aeolid nudibranch, a marine gastropod mollusc in the family Flabellinidae.

Distribution
This species was described from Isla San Diego, Baja California, Mexico. Coryphellina marcusorum is thought to occur in two disjunct populations in the waters of central and south America: one group on the west coast of central America in the eastern Pacific Ocean and as far east as the Galapagos Islands and the other on the east side of the continent in the Caribbean Sea and in the western Atlantic Ocean down to Brazil.

Description
Coryphellina marcusorum has a mainly translucent pink or orange body colour. The elongate rhinophores, foot corners and cerata are tipped with opaque white (or sometimes opaque yellow), with a broad, purple band beneath. The posterior face of the rhinophores may have up to one hundred papillae. The oral tentacles are elongate and thin, and are longer than the rhinophores.

The maximum recorded body length is 25 mm or up to 30 mm.

This species is very similar in colouration to the recently described African species Coryphellina arveloi. A comparison with other Flabellinidae species from Mexico is given in the description of Orienthella fogata.

Habitat
Minimum recorded depth is 3 m. Maximum recorded depth is 22 m.

References

External links
 

Flabellinidae
Gastropods described in 1990